Anastasia State Park is a  state park in Florida, United States. Its location is on a peninsula on Anastasia Island across Matanzas Bay from downtown St. Augustine along the Atlantic coastal plain. This park has a variety of wildlife, birds and plants in a setting of beaches, tidal salt marsh, and marine and upland hammock.

It is also home to the Old Spanish Coquina Quarries, an archaeological site from which the coquina stone used in the construction of the Castillo de San Marcos in St. Augustine was mined, earning it a spot on the National Register of Historic Places.

Acquired by the state of Florida in 1949, Anastasia State Park has long been a favorite playground for hundreds of thousands of visitors each year.

Recreational activities
Activities include bird watching, camping, fishing, sun bathing, beachcombing, running, surfing, sail boarding, swimming, kayaking, hiking, and picnicking.

Along with park interpretive programs and nature trails, there is also a campground. The campground contains 139 campsites all located within the beautiful maritime hammock and just a short walk or bike ride from the beach. Anastasia State Park has concessions to provide guests with rental opportunities of bicycles, paddleboards, kayaks and canoes. There is also a grill area and a small gift shop for visitors to take home an Anastasia memory. The grill location also provides Wi-Fi for visitors' use.

Hours
Florida state parks are open between 8 a.m. and sundown every day of the year (including holidays).

See also

Fort Mose Historic State Park
St. Augustine Amphitheatre

References and external links

Anastasia State Park at Florida State Parks

State parks of Florida
Parks in St. Johns County, Florida
Protected areas established in 1949
1949 establishments in Florida